San Tommaso delle Convertite is a small church in Pisa, Italy.

Documents take note of a church adjacent to an annexed hospital in 1160. In 1610, the grand-duchess of Tuscany Christina of Lorraine, commissioned the convent to house rescued (converted) prostitutes, hence the name. 

The church and its façade were rebuilt in 1756-1758  by Camillo Marracci using designs by Ignazio Pellegrini. The church ceiling has the symbols of the patron, Christina of Lorraine.

References

Tommaso delle Convertite
Roman Catholic churches completed in 1758
Baroque architecture in Pisa
Magdalene asylums
18th-century Roman Catholic church buildings in Italy